Echinoplectanum rarum is a species of diplectanid monogenean parasitic on the gills of the leopard coralgrouper, Plectropomus leopardus. It has been described in 2006.

This species is very rare and represented only 2% of the specimens of Echinoplectanum spp. found in P. leopardus. This species was  distinguished from other species of the same genus by its characteristic ring-shaped sclerotised vagina.

Etymology
The epithet rarum is Latin for rare.

Hosts and localities

The leopard  coral grouper Plectropomus leopardus is the type-host of Echinoplectanum rarum. The type-locality is the coral reef off Nouméa, New Caledonia.
In New Caledonia, this fish harbours three species of the genus Echinoplectanum, namely E. rarum, E. pudicum and E. leopardi.

References

External links 

Diplectanidae
Animals described in 2006
Fauna of New Caledonia